On March 2 and 3, 2012, a deadly tornado outbreak occurred over a large section of the Southern United States into the Ohio Valley region. The storms resulted in 41 tornado-related fatalities, 22 of which occurred in Kentucky. Tornado-related deaths also occurred in Alabama, Indiana, and Ohio. The outbreak was the second deadliest in early March for the U.S. since official records began in 1950; only the 1966 Candlestick Park tornado had a higher death toll for a tornadic system in early March.

Meteorological synopsis

February 2012 was more active than normal in terms of the number of tornadoes, with a total of 50 confirmed. While the first three weeks of the month were unusually quiet, the pattern changed abruptly with a major tornado outbreak, which struck the region less than 72 hours prior to this storm, killing 15 people, including 8 in Harrisburg, Illinois alone, the result of an EF4 tornado.

A moderate risk of severe weather was issued for March 2 a day in advance for a large area from near Tuscaloosa, Alabama to Dayton, Ohio as an intense storm system tracked across the region in a very high shear environment. Intense tornadoes were possible. On the morning of March 2, it was upgraded and a high risk of severe weather was issued for Middle Tennessee and central Kentucky, later extended into Central and Southern Indiana and southern Ohio. The Storm Prediction Center mentioned the potential for significant tornadoes. Multiple PDS tornado watches were issued shortly thereafter.

The outbreak began fairly early in the morning, with an initial round of storms and tornadoes associated with the incoming warm front attached to a rapidly deepening low-pressure area over the central Great Lakes. One of these early day storms produced a damaging EF3 tornado that impacted Harvest, Alabama.

The initial round of storms allowed for a strong warm air mass to enter the region, with temperatures rising to near-record levels for early March and instability combining with extreme wind shear, resulting in a highly volatile air mass.

As a result, a second, much larger broken line of discrete supercells developed and followed the Ohio River, with additional storms developing farther south. During the afternoon, those cells tracked eastward across the Ohio Valley, passing north of Louisville, Kentucky and south of Cincinnati, Ohio with devastating results. One long-tracked EF4 tornado ripped through the Indiana towns of New Pekin, Henryville, Marysville, and Chelsea, killing 11 people.

As isolated activity developed farther south, intense supercells also formed in central Kentucky in the late afternoon hours and tracked east into the Eastern Mountain Coal Fields region before weakening as they reached West Virginia later that evening. That area had the highest wind shear – with helicity values as high as 800 m2/s2 (despite lower instability) and that allowed the storms to spin violently, resulting in severe damage in several communities. The town of West Liberty, Kentucky was devastated by a mile-wide EF3 tornado that killed 10 people.

The next day, on March 3, the cold front continued to push eastwards toward the United States East Coast, although the most severe activity took place near the Georgia-Florida state border. A slight risk of severe weather was issued for a small area extending from Cape Hatteras to the Mississippi Delta. A mesoscale convective system in South Carolina was responsible for hail reports in the area, although the threat for tornadoes was reduced with lower instability levels. Most tornado activity for the day was associated with an upper-level system in Florida, and mainly consisted of isolated, weak tornadoes touching down across the Southeastern United States. However, an EF3 wedge tornado caused significant damage near Moody Air Force Base in Georgia.

On March 4, most of the cold front responsible for the outbreak had already moved into the Atlantic Ocean with only a small portion of thunderstorms extending into Florida. A slight risk was issued for a section of Florida. Some scattered activity lingered around the East Coast for the duration of the day, but no additional tornadoes were reported.

Confirmed tornadoes

March 2 event

March 3 event

New Pekin – Henryville – Marysville – Chelsea, Indiana/Bedford, Kentucky

The deadliest tornado of the outbreak was a violent stovepipe tornado that carved a  path of damage from Fredericksburg, Indiana to the Bedford, Kentucky area. Along its track, the tornado destroyed hundreds of homes and killed 11 people. Countless were injured. The most severe damage took place in and around the small communities of New Pekin, Henryville, Marysville and Chelsea, Indiana.

The tornado first touched down in Washington County around 2:50 p.m. EST at the south edge of Fredericksburg, snapping trees at EF1 strength along a narrow path as it moved to the northeast. Several minutes later, the tornado intensified to high-end EF2 strength as it destroyed a metal truss tower and snapped numerous trees. Smaller pieces of pavement were found up to a quarter-mile away. Just beyond this point, the tornado path began to widen and tremendous tree damage was observed. Homes in this area sustained damage ranging from EF2 to EF3 in intensity. As it neared the south side of New Pekin, the tornado widened and strengthened even more. The tornado clipped the southern fringes of town, and a large factory building was leveled to its foundation with large amounts of debris swept away. Anchor bolts were bent at this location, and debris from the factory was scattered up to  downwind. A metal building on the edge of the circulation had metal sheeting pulled off, apparently from the force of inbound winds towards the circulation. Nearby, an entire family of five was killed when their mobile home was obliterated. Several other homes and mobile homes were heavily damaged or destroyed in the New Pekin area as well. As it neared the Clark County border, the tornado produced high-end EF3 to EF4 strength damage to many homes and farmsteads as it traversed rural areas. One brick home at the top of a ridge was completely leveled, and a heavy trailer cab from this location was found a quarter-mile away at the remains of another destroyed brick home. Several cows missing from this vicinity were never located, and thousands of trees were mowed down along a swath up to a half-mile wide. Outbuildings and grain bins were also destroyed, and a car was thrown  from one residence as well.

The tornado maintained EF4 strength as it crossed into Clark County, completely leveling several well-built homes shortly after crossing the county line. However, the tornado weakened briefly further to the northeast, as two double-wide mobile homes were destroyed at EF2 intensity, while a frame home sustained EF3 damage. One man was killed in one of the mobile homes shortly after he recorded video of the approaching tornado. Outbuildings were destroyed, and a few other homes along this segment of the path sustained minor to moderate damage.  As the tornado crossed Interstate 65, it restrengthened to EF4 intensity and serious injuries occurred as multiple vehicles were tossed and semi-trucks were flipped. The highway was closed for hours, and multiple people had to be extracted from their crumpled vehicles.

Immediately east of the interstate, the tornado ripped through the town of Henryville, resulting in devastating damage throughout the town. The Henryville school complex was in the process of dismissing as the tornado approached the community, and sustained EF4 structural damage including total destruction of its cafeteria. Most of the staff and students had already left the area by the time the tornado struck. One bus driver saved numerous student's lives by returning to the school. The small group of students that returned and took shelter in the school building survived without injury, despite being inside as it was destroyed around them. Many cars in the school parking lot were thrown and destroyed, one of which had a wooden beam speared through its hood and out of its undercarriage. The school security cameras recorded video of the tornado striking the building, and it is still viewable on YouTube to this day. Low-level winds in this area were so intense that debris was found wedged underneath plastic reflective strips in the parking lot. School buses were thrown hundreds of feet away, and two were ripped from their chassis. One bus was thrown through the front wall of a nearby restaurant, while a gas station, several large metal industrial buildings, and multiple other businesses and structures in town were severely damaged or destroyed. Numerous homes in and around Henryville were destroyed, and some were flattened or swept from their foundations. Damage surveyors found evidence of very intense multiple vortices as the tornado entered the community. Massive deforestation occurred in heavily wooded areas around town, and debris from Henryville was found as far east as Ohio.

Past Henryville, the tornado dramatically weakened and lost its ominous shape, taking on a narrow rope-like appearance and inflicting only EF1 damage. However, this phase was short-lived as the tornado quickly re-intensified into a high-end EF3 storm with a dramatic multiple-vortex structure. The tornado moved east and struck the small town of Marysville, heavily damaging or destroying many of the structures in the small community. Several block foundation homes in town were swept away with debris scattered through nearby farm fields. Vehicles were tossed, many trees were snapped and denuded, outbuildings were destroyed, and a church was damaged in the Marysville area as well. Damage surveys in this area showed a complex damage pattern, with evidence of sub-vortices developing well away from the main damage path, before either being pulled in and absorbed by the central tornadic circulation, or intensifying and becoming the primary circulation themselves at times. Aerial flyovers revealed extensive cycloidal scouring marks in farm fields outside of Marysville. EF3 damage continued to the east of Marysville as several homes and double-wide mobile homes were destroyed, with debris from the mobile homes was scattered up to a mile downwind. The tornado then briefly entered Scott County, regaining EF4 intensity and killing a man in the complete destruction of his frame home, obliterating five mobile homes, and severely damaging two other frame homes. The tornado then briefly crossed back into Clark County, causing major damage to two homes and several power poles before entering Jefferson County as an EF4.

In Jefferson County, the tornado skirted the south edge of the small community of Chelsea, completely leveling several well-built homes. An older farm home was swept cleanly away in this area, killing three people inside. Debris was scattered hundreds of yards through nearby fields, cars were thrown 75 yards away, and a piece of farm machinery was thrown 200 yards. Another home was lifted from its foundation and dragged 65 yards into a field while left relatively intact. An above ground pool missing from this area after the tornado was never found, and multiple trees were ripped out of the ground by their roots and thrown. One other person was also killed at another home in the Chelsea area as well. The tornado then narrowed, weakened to EF2 intensity, and crossed into Trimble County, Kentucky, destroying barns, mobile homes, and downing many trees and power lines before dissipating near the town of Bedford.

Days after the outbreak, a New Pekin resident began helping others recover lost items through a Facebook page called "I Found Your Memory." Items such as high school diplomas were tossed as far away as Cincinnati; however, they were able to be returned through this page. Relief centers were opened in the heart of Henryville with the Henryville Community Church becoming the main center over the next weeks and months. On March 8, a long term recovery group, March2Recovery was formed to deal with the aftermath and rebuilding in the five affected counties. By March 14, FEMA deployed mobile disaster recovery centers across areas affected by the tornado outbreak. One of these centers was planned to be opened up on March 16 in New Pekin. A local baseball team in southern Indiana began raising money on March 14 to help those injured pay for their medical fees.

In 2022, the National Weather Service office in Louisville referred to a possible EF5 damage location at a demolished house, where a pickup truck was blown away and never found and a backhoe was deposited into the basement of the house.

Crittenden – Piner – Morning View, Kentucky

This violent wedge tornado was spawned by the same supercell thunderstorm that produced the EF4 Henryville tornado. While not a long-tracked tornado, the damage it produced was very intense along portions of its 9.85-mile long path through parts of northern Kentucky. After the parent supercell had crossed into Kentucky and the Henryville tornado had lifted, the storm began to rotate significantly again as it approached the Grant County town of Crittenden.

At 4:23 PM, the supercell produced a strong tornado that touched down in the northern part of Crittenden, and immediately began producing significant damage as it impacted multiple residential subdivisions. The worst damage in town occurred at the Harvester subdivision, where many two-story homes were heavily damaged with some losing roofs and exterior walls. Damage to homes in the town of Crittenden ranged from EF1 to low-end EF3 in intensity. As the tornado exited Crittenden, it intensified further as it crossed Interstate 75 and hurled vehicles off of the highway, killing one woman. The tornado then approached and crossed U.S. Route 25, reaching EF4 intensity and completely sweeping away five frame homes, two of which were anchored to their foundations, though the anchoring mechanisms were too widely spaced, negating a higher rating.

Further along the path, EF4 damage continued as two anchored brick homes were completely leveled and multiple outbuildings were obliterated. Extremely intense vehicle damage occurred in this area as multiple vehicles were lofted long distances through the air and mangled. One vehicle was carried over 600 yards from where it originated. Many large trees were snapped and uprooted in this area as well, including some that were completely denuded and sustained severe debarking. Three additional deaths occurred along his segment of the path, with two of the fatalities occurring in a frame home and the other taking place in a vehicle. The tornado continued to the southwest and south of Piner, weakening back to EF3 strength as it traversed rural areas. Well-built frame homes along this segment of the path had their roofs ripped off and exterior walls collapsed. Numerous single-wide and double-wide mobile homes were completely destroyed in this area as well.

Continuing further to the east, the tornado continued to weaken as it approached Morning View, causing a mixture of EF1 and EF2 damage to structures before dissipating south of town. Overall, this tornado killed four people and injured 8 others along its path, reaching a maximum width of one half-mile. As the storm was moving through northern Kentucky, large amounts of debris was observed falling out of the sky, which caused the Cincinnati/Northern Kentucky International Airport to stop all flights for one hour.

Peach Grove, Kentucky/Moscow – Hamersville, Ohio

After producing the violent EF4 Henryville and Crittenden tornadoes, the same parent supercell entered Campbell County, Kentucky and produced another tornado to the west of Peach Grove at 4:39 PM. This rain-wrapped wedge tornado moved east and reached high-end EF3 intensity as it neared the Pendleton County line, damaging or destroying several homes in the area. Damage surveyors noted some modular block foundation homes in this area that were lifted into the air intact, before being thrown in excess of 100 yards and smashed back to the ground, completely obliterating them.  straight line winds from the parent supercell caused additional damage away from the main damage path in this area as well.

After crossing into Pendleton County, the tornado produced a mixture of EF2 and EF3 damage as it passed north of Peach Grove. Multiple homes, mobile homes, barns, and outbuildings along this segment of the path were destroyed, and many trees were snapped and uprooted as well. The tornado then continued across the Ohio River into Clermont County, Ohio, immediately slamming into the small riverside village of Moscow at high-end EF3 intensity. Moscow was devastated by the tornado, with 80% of the village being heavily damaged or destroyed. Numerous two story homes had roofs and exterior walls ripped off, and a few homes in town were completely flattened. Almost every tree in Moscow was uprooted, snapped, or denuded by the tornado. A 64-year-old woman was found dead in the rubble of her home, and several other residents were injured.

Beyond Moscow, the tornado continued through rural areas of Clermont County, damaging and destroying many additional homes and outbuildings, snapping many trees, as well and killing two other people in the destruction of a mobile home. The tornado then crossed into Brown County, weakening to EF1 strength as it passed near the town of Hamersville. Damage along this portion of the path consisted of roof damage to homes, damage to trees, outbuildings destroyed, and mobile homes blown off of their foundations and severely damaged. The tornado then lifted to the south of Hamersville.

Overall, this tornado killed three people along its path and injured 13 others.

West Liberty, Kentucky/Dunlow – Cove Gap, West Virginia

This deadly, long-tracked EF3 tornado first touched down in Menifee County, Kentucky to the southwest of Mariba. It rapidly attained EF3 strength before moving east and passing to the south of Wellington, heavily damaging or destroying multiple homes along this segment of the path, snapping or uprooting many large trees, killing two people, and injuring many others. One block foundation home was removed from its foundation and leveled, while a nearby brick home lost its roof and exterior walls. A brick split-level home had only its basement floor remaining, with the rest of the house being completely carried away and disintegrated. Structural debris and house contents from this location was strewn long distances across nearby hillsides.

Further east, the tornado expanded to nearly a mile wide and entered Morgan County, passing north of Ezel before ripping directly through downtown West Liberty at EF3 strength, resulting in catastrophic damage. Massive structural damage occurred in downtown West Liberty, with many brick buildings and businesses being heavily damaged or destroyed, and many vehicles being tossed against buildings or crushed by falling structural debris. Every building in and around the downtown area sustained major damage, with the 105-year-old courthouse, the depression-era WPA building that housed the community center, and the 100-year-old West Liberty United Methodist and Christian churches all being either heavily damaged or suffering total destruction. The local hospital sustained major damage as well. Residential areas in town were also devastated with numerous homes destroyed, including some unanchored homes that were swept from their foundations. Footage of the tornado in this area revealed a rapidly rotating lowered cloud base with a large debris cloud underneath, but no visible condensation funnel. Six people were killed in West Liberty, and many others were injured, some severely. Past West Liberty, the tornado continued through other rural portions of the county, expanding up to a full mile wide as it snapped thousands of trees and caused extensive damage to structures.

Maintaining EF3 strength, the tornado then briefly moved through a portion of Lawrence County near the community of Terryville, obliterating several mobile homes and injuring two people. Crossing into Johnson County, the tornado weakened to EF1 strength as downed many trees and caused roof damage to several structures before crossing back into Lawrence County and regaining EF3 strength as it passed near Martha, Blaine, and a few other rural communities further to the east. 30 homes and mobile homes were destroyed along this segment of the path, 9 others sustained major damage, and the Blaine community building was damaged as well. A double-wide mobile home was lofted and slammed into a hillside by the tornado, killing two people inside. The tornado then crossed the state border into Wayne County, West Virginia.

Continuing at EF3 strength, the tornado snapped and uprooted numerous trees as it approached the community of Dunlow. The tornado then impacted the northern fringes of Dunlow, destroying five homes and severely damaging another. Three vehicles were damaged as well. At the nearby East Lynn Lake campground, many trees, electrical lines, and telephone lines were downed. Further along the path, the tornado passed near Cove Gap, destroying 15 homes and inflicting major damage to 7 others. This included a two-story home that had its roof and multiple exterior and interior walls torn away. Narrow roads and hillsides in the area were left covered in fallen trees and power lines, pieces of sheet metal roofing, and damaged vehicles. Ironically, a funeral in the area that evening may have saved several lives since it was being held in a nearby community for a Cove Gap resident at the time of the tornado. Several neighbors attended the funeral and were not at home when the storm hit, only later to return to find their homes damaged or destroyed.

The tornado continued into Lincoln County, weakening to EF1 strength and downing additional trees before dissipating to the east of Ranger. This tornado was on the ground for 86 miles with a peak width of 1 mile. 10 people were killed along the path and 112 others were injured. The tornado was the first F3/EF3 in Eastern Kentucky since 1988.

Salyersville – Hager Hill – West Van Lear – Lovely, Kentucky/Kermit, West Virginia

This destructive, long-tracked nighttime tornado first touched down in a populated area of Wolfe County, Kentucky at 6:50 PM, snapping trees at EF1 strength before quickly crossing into Magoffin County. Once in Magoffin County, the tornado began to widen and intensify as it continued along its path, snapping many trees and crossing the Bert T. Combs Mountain Parkway multiple times. Reaching high-end EF3 intensity and a path width of 3/4 of a mile wide, the tornado struck the town Salyersville, resulting in major damage. Numerous homes in Salyersville were destroyed, some of which were leveled. Mobile homes were completely destroyed, and vehicles were flipped and tossed. A McDonald's, a motel, an apartment complex, several gas stations, and three school buildings sustained major structural damage in town, along with many other structures and businesses. A church and an Advance Auto Parts store were almost completely destroyed as well. Despite the damage, no deaths occurred in Salyersville, though 30 people were injured.

Past Salyersville, the tornado maintained its strength and caused additional major damage in the rural community of Conley before crossing into Johnson County. High-end EF3 damage continued in Johnson County, and two fatalities occurred along this segment of the path as a mobile home was obliterated. Major damage occurred near Collista as the tornado crossed U.S. Route 23 and State Highway 825. Multiple frame homes and manufactured homes were damaged or destroyed, vehicles were flipped, a metal truss tower was crumpled and destroyed, and entire hillsides and ridges were deforested by the tornado. One house was blown onto Highway 825, blocking the road. The tornado then struck nearby Hager Hill, where several additional structures were destroyed. Kentucky Route 321 and Kentucky Route 1428 were both blocked by collapsed apartment buildings in Hager Hill, while semi-trailers were flipped and industrial buildings were damaged as well in town. Past Hager Hill, the tornado weakened somewhat as it immediately struck the neighboring town of West Van Lear, tearing the roofs off of numerous homes and a church.

The tornado continued at high-end EF2 strength into Martin County, passing between Davella and Debord. Entire hillsides were deforested, a brick structure was destroyed, a one-story brick home lost its roof and some exterior walls, and a two-story home sustained damage to its second floor in this area. Additional hillsides suffered total deforestation in the Beauty community before the tornado struck the town of Lovely at the Kentucky/West Virginia state border. EF2 damage occurred in Lovely as trees were snapped and multiple homes had their roofs torn off.

The tornado then crossed into Mingo County, West Virginia just south of Kermit. 
Additional EF2 damage occurred as many trees were snapped and a 280-foot high railroad communications tower was toppled to the ground before the tornado dissipated. Debris from Lovely was found deposited on mountaintops in the Kermit area. 
In addition to the two fatalities, 37 other people were injured by this tornado along its 49-mile long path.

See also

List of North American tornadoes and tornado outbreaks
2012 Leap Day tornado outbreak – An outbreak that occurred days prior over similar areas
Tornado outbreak of March 2–3, 2020 – A much smaller outbreak that mainly affected Tennessee eight years later

Notes

References

External links

 Time-lapse visualization of the March 2, 2012 tornado outbreak
 The March 2, 2012 Tornado Outbreak (NWS Jackson, KY)
 March 2, 2012 Tornado Outbreak (NWS Louisville, KY)
 Severe Weather Event with KY/IN EF-2 Tornadoes - March 2, 2012 (NWS Paducah, KY)
 March 2, 2012 Tornado Outbreak and Severe Weather (NWS Wilmington, OH)
 March 2, 2012 Tornado Outbreak (NWS Nashville, TN)
 March 2, 2012 Storm Survey (NWS Huntsville, AL)
 Tornadoes and Severe Weather of March 2, 2012 (NWS Birmingham, AL)
 Videotaped presentations on the 2 March 2012 tornado outbreak in east Tennessee (NWS Morristown, TN)

03-02
Tornadoes in Alabama
Tornadoes in Indiana
Tornadoes in Kentucky
Tornadoes in Ohio
Tornadoes in Tennessee
Morgan County, Kentucky
F4 tornadoes by date
Articles containing video clips
Tornado outbreak